Mark of the Spur is a 1932 American pre-Code Western film directed by J.P. McGowan and starring Bob Custer, Lillian Rich and George Chesebro.

Cast
 Bob Custer as The Kid
 Lillian Rich as Alice - Beckett's Adopted Daughter
 George Chesebro as John Beckett
 Lafe McKee as 'Hardshell' Beckett
 Adabelle Driver as Mrs. Beckett
 Franklyn Farnum as Sheriff Jake Ludlow 
 Blackie Whiteford as 	Butch - Henchman
 Bud Osborne as Buzzard - Henchman
 Charles Edler as Deputy Sleepy
 Frank Ball  as Station Agent 
 Horace B. Carpenter as Doc 
 Jack Hendricks as Tex - Ranch Hand 
 Jack Kirk as Singer 
 Jack Long as 	Slim 
 Fred 'Snowflake' Toones as Ranch Cook

References

Bibliography
 Michael R. Pitts. Poverty Row Studios, 1929–1940: An Illustrated History of 55 Independent Film Companies, with a Filmography for Each. McFarland & Company, 2005.

External links
 

1932 films
1932 Western (genre) films
American Western (genre) films
Films directed by J. P. McGowan
1930s English-language films
1930s American films